Dmitri Viktorovich Batynkov (born 7 May 1970) is a former Russian professional footballer.

Playing career
He made his debut in the Soviet Top League in 1991 for FC Dynamo Moscow.

Honours
 Uzbek League bronze: 1998.

References

1970 births
Footballers from Moscow
Living people
Soviet footballers
Russian footballers
Russian expatriate footballers
Expatriate footballers in Uzbekistan
FC Dynamo Moscow players
FC Dynamo Stavropol players
Russian Premier League players
FC Shinnik Yaroslavl players
Navbahor Namangan players
Association football midfielders
FC Torpedo Moscow players
FC Sheksna Cherepovets players